This is a list of rural localities in Krasnodar Krai. Krasnodar Krai is a federal subject of Russia (a krai), located in the North Caucasus region in Southern Russia and administratively a part of the Southern Federal District. Its administrative center is the city of Krasnodar. The third most-populous federal subject, the krai had a population of 5,226,647 as of the 2010 Census.

Abinsky District 
Rural localities in Abinsky District:

 Kholmskaya

Adlersky City District 
Rural localities in Adlersky City District:

 Estosadok
 Vesyoloye

Anapa Urban Okrug 
Rural localities in Anapa Urban Okrug:

 Gaikodzor
 Vityazevo

Anapsky District 
Rural localities in Anapsky District:

 Sukko

Apsheronsky District 
Rural localities in Apsheronsky District:

 Mezmay

Beloglinsky District 
Rural localities in Beloglinsky District:

 Belaya Glina

Belorechensky District 
Rural localities in Belorechensky District:

 Ryazanskaya

Bryukhovetsky District 
Rural localities in Bryukhovetsky District:

 Bryukhovetskaya

Dinskoy District 
Rural localities in Dinskoy District:

 Dinskaya

Gelendzhik 
Rural localities in Gelendzhik urban okrug:

 Arkhipo-Osipovka

Goryachy Klyuch 
Rural localities in Goryachy Klyuch urban okrug:

 Molkin
 Saratovskaya

Kalininsky District 
Rural localities in Kalininsky District:

 Kalininskaya

Kanevskoy District 
Rural localities in Kanevskoy District:

 Kanevskaya

Kavkazsky District 
Rural localities in Kavkazsky District:

 Kavkazskaya
 Kazanskaya
 Temizhbekskaya

Korenovsky District 
Rural localities in Korenovsky District:

 Platnirovskaya

Krasnoarmeysky District 
Rural localities in Krasnoarmeysky District:

 Poltavskaya

Krylovsky District 
Rural localities in Krylovsky District:

 Krylovskaya

Kushchyovsky District 
Rural localities in Kushchyovsky District:

 Kushchyovskaya
 Shkurinskaya

Leningradsky District 
Rural localities in Leningradsky District:

 Leningradskaya

Mostovsky District 
Rural localities in Mostovsky District:

 Kostromskaya

Novokubansky District 
Rural localities in Novokubansky District:

 Besskorbnaya
 Sovetskaya

Novopokrovsky District 
Rural localities in Novopokrovsky District:

 Kalnibolotskaya
 Novopokrovskaya

Novorossiysk 
Rural localities in Novorossiysk urban okrug:

 Abrau-Dyurso

Otradnensky District 
Rural localities in Otradnensky District:

 Otradnaya

Pavlovsky District 
Rural localities in Pavlovsky District:

 Pavlovskaya

Seversky District 
Rural localities in Seversky District:

 8 Marta
 Severskaya

Shcherbinovsky District 
Rural localities in Shcherbinovsky District:

 Staroshcherbinovskaya

Starominsky District 
Rural localities in Starominsky District:

 Starominskaya

Tbilissky District 
Rural localities in Tbilissky District:

 Tbilisskaya

Temryuksky District 
Rural localities in Temryuksky District:

 Fontalovskaya
 Sennoy
 Starotitarovskaya
 Taman
 Vyshestebliyevskaya

Tikhoretsky District 
Rural localities in Tikhoretsky District:

 Kirpichny

Timashyovsky District 
Rural localities in Timashyovsky District:

 Medvedovskaya

Uspensky District 
Rural localities in Uspensky District:

 Konokovo
 Uspenskoye

Ust-Labinsky District 
Rural localities in Ust-Labinsky District:

 Ladozhskaya

Vyselkovsky District 
Rural localities in Vyselkovsky District:

 Vyselki

Yeysky District 
Rural localities in Yeysky District:

 Dolzhanskaya

See also 
 
 Lists of rural localities in Russia

References 

Krasnodar Krai